ETH-LAD, 6-ethyl-6-nor-lysergic acid diethylamide  is an analogue of LSD. Its human psychopharmacology was first described by Alexander Shulgin in the book TiHKAL. ETH-LAD is a psychedelic drug similar to LSD, and is slightly more potent than LSD itself, with an active dose reported at between 20 and 150 micrograms. ETH-LAD has subtly different effects to LSD, described as less demanding.

Legality

On June 10, 2014 the UK Advisory Council on the Misuse of Drugs (ACMD) recommended that ETH-LAD be specifically named in the UK Misuse of Drugs Act as a class A drug despite not identifying it as ever having been sold or any harm associated with its use. The UK Home office accepted this advice and announced a ban of the substance to be enacted on 6 January 2015.

ETH-LAD is illegal in Switzerland as of December 2015.

See also 
 Lysergic acid diethylamide (LSD)
 1cP-LSD
 1B-LSD
 1P-LSD
 1V-LSD
 ALD-52
 1cP-AL-LAD
 AL-LAD
 1P-ETH-LAD
 PRO-LAD
 LSM-775
 LSZ
 O-Acetylpsilocin (4-AcO-DMT)

References

Further reading

External links 
 ETH-LAD entry in TIHKAL
 ETH-LAD entry in Isomerdesign

Designer drugs
Entheogens
Lysergamides
Serotonin receptor agonists